Arthur "Art" George Bragg (December 3, 1930 – August 25, 2018) was an American sprinter who competed in the 1952 Summer Olympics.

Career 

He was born in Baltimore and attended Baltimore's Morgan State College.,

In 1952 he was eliminated in the semi-finals of the Olympic 100 metres event. Running with a pulled muscle, he finished 'a miserable last' in his race. Bragg was considered the favourite for the title having won the USA Olympic Trials 100m in the absence, through injury, of the man judged to be the best American sprinter, Jim Golliday. Bragg also tried to qualify for the 200 m event but was only fourth in his semi-final at the Olympic Trials.

At the 1951 Pan American Games he was a member of the American relay team which won the gold medal in the 4×100 metres competition. In the 100 metres contest as well as in the 200 metres event he won the silver medal. In both races he lost narrowly to Cuba's Rafael Fortun.

Always a keen college runner, in 1953, Bragg helped, as anchor leg, Morgan State College to victories in the quarter- and half-mile relays at the Penn Relays. Bragg also completed a triple of individual wins.

Bragg continued running after leaving college. In 1954 he won the 100 and 220 yards titles at the AAU Championships. In both he established new AAU meet records of 9.4 and 21.1 s respectively.

Bragg was famed at the time he was racing for his often slow start to his races with a subsequent fast finish and the disappointments he suffered in his career at the major championships.

In 1954, Bragg was one of the candidates for the prestigious James E. Sullivan Award that is presented annually by the AAU to the outstanding American athlete. If he had won he would have been the first African-American recipient of the award. In the end, the award went to Mal Whitfield.

Bragg has admitted his Olympic disappointment lives with him - when watching the 100 m "I cried," Bragg said. "I had successes; that was the major disappointment. Every Olympics, when I watch the 100 on TV, I break down and cry." He has described his 1952 injury as a total fluke - whilst on the warmup strip "Someone opened one of the doors and I made a quick motion to my left to avoid hitting it . . . oops, the hamstring went.".

In later years, Bragg is reported as living in Los Angeles and working for Los Angeles County Probation Department as a Deputy Probation Officer. He is married with one child, a boy. He left for California in 1956 and never returned to Maryland. His son studied at Howard University.

Notes

Rankings

Bragg was ranked among the best in the US and the world in both the 100 m/100 y and 200 m/220 y sprint events from 1950 to 1954, according to the votes of the experts of Track and Field News.

USA Championships 
Bragg was always a formidable performer at the AAU championships, the USA national championships.

Competition record

References

1930 births
2018 deaths
American male sprinters
Olympic track and field athletes of the United States
Athletes (track and field) at the 1952 Summer Olympics
Pan American Games track and field athletes for the United States
Athletes (track and field) at the 1951 Pan American Games
Pan American Games gold medalists for the United States
Pan American Games silver medalists for the United States
Pan American Games medalists in athletics (track and field)
Track and field athletes from California
Track and field athletes from Baltimore
USA Outdoor Track and Field Championships winners
Medalists at the 1951 Pan American Games